Zimovnoye is a rural locality (a selo) in Shebekinsky District, Belgorod Oblast, Russia. The population was 407 as of 2010. There are 8 streets.

Geography 
Zimovnoye is located 49 km northeast of Shebekino (the district's administrative centre) by road. Verkhneberyozovo is the nearest rural locality.

References 

Rural localities in Shebekinsky District